Brooker Creek Preserve is located in Pinellas County, Florida, owned by the Pinellas County government and the Southwest Florida Water Management District, and managed by the Pinellas County Parks and Conservation Resources Department.  It encompasses 8,700 acres (35km2) and offers birding, horseback riding, and hiking.  The Preserve office is located at 3940 Keystone Road, Tarpon Springs, Florida,

The Brooker Creek Preserve Environmental Education Center features displays and interactive exhibits about Florida natural history and local history.  Educational and interpretive programs are offered for the public.

Aboriginal History
"Native people hunted and gathered here for thousands of years, leaving behind spear points that date from 7000 BCE to 900 CE."  The most recent aboriginal tribe to occupy the land that encompasses the Brooker Creek Preserve was the Tocobaga tribe.  The Tocobaga declined in the 17th century and became extinct in the 18th century due to disease and violence.

Gallery
Photos added here are from the nature trail near the education center.

See also
Brooker Creek Headwaters Nature Preserve

References

External links
 Official Brooker Creek Preserve Website
 Friends of Brooker Creek Preserve

Parks in Pinellas County, Florida
Tarpon Springs, Florida
Nature centers in Florida
Southwest Florida Water Management District reserves
1992 establishments in Florida
Protected areas established in 1992